Baffled! is a 1973 British made-for-television supernatural thriller film, which was intended as a pilot for a television series. The story is part of the occult detective subgenre and starred Leonard Nimoy, Susan Hampshire, Rachel Roberts and Vera Miles.

Plot
Race car driver Tom Kovack (played by Leonard Nimoy) suddenly begins to experience psychic visions.  He meets Michelle Brent (played by Susan Hampshire), an expert on the paranormal, and the two form an unlikely partnership.  Kovack's visions draw them into an occult-themed mystery at a remote inn on the English coast.

Cast
Leonard Nimoy as Tom Kovack
Susan Hampshire as Michele Brent
Rachel Roberts as Mrs. Farraday
Vera Miles as Andrea Glenn
Jewel Blanch as Jennifer Glenn
Valerie Taylor as Louise Sanford
Ray Brooks as George Tracewell
Angharad Rees as Peggy Tracewell
Christopher Benjamin as Verelli

References

External links
 

1973 television films
1973 films
1970s science fiction thriller films
British thriller television films
Occult detective fiction
British science fiction thriller films
NBC network original films
Films directed by Philip Leacock
Films shot at Pinewood Studios
Television films as pilots
Television pilots not picked up as a series
Television series by ITC Entertainment
1970s English-language films
1970s British films